Anning is a county-level city under the jurisdiction of Kunming, the capital of Yunnan province, China. It is located approximately 28 kilometers southwest of Kunming city proper. In 1995, Anning was upgraded to a county-level city from a county.

Administrative divisions
Lianran Subdistrict, Jinfang Subdistrict, Taiping New City Subdistrict, Bajie Subdistrict, Xianjie Subdistrict, Wenquan Subdistrict, Qionglong Subdistrict, Caopu Subdistrict and Lubiao Subdistrict.

Economy 
Anning is the largest metallurgical, salt, and phosphorus chemical base in Yunnan Province, home to the largest steel company in Kunming, Yunnan, and the main production base of Yuntianhua Group, the largest chemical company in Yunnan. With PetroChina Yunnan Petrochemical's 10 million ton oil refining project settled in Caopu area of Anning Industrial Park, Anning will become the center of Yunnan Petrochemical Industry. However, due to concerns that the project contains PX projects, in 2013 Kunming City broke out against PX projects.

Tourism 

The Anning Hot Spring is a popular holiday resort and tourist destination in Kunming. It lies at 1,795 meters above sea level and is nestled at the foot of the Yuquan Mountain, also known as the Jade Spring Hill, in an area that is lush with trees and a beautifully preserved natural park. Aside from the Yuquanshan, it is also near Congshan Hill in the west and Bijiashan Hill in the northeast. Since it is flanked by graceful mountains on three sides and is also near the Tanglangchuan River, the area is the perfect place for those who love nature. The quiet atmosphere and the hot springs provide everything one will need for a truly relaxing experience. For this reason, the place is sometimes dubbed as "The best hot spring under the sun."

History 
In the reign of Emperor Wu of the Han Dynasty, it was sealed in Lianran County for two years (109 BC). Then, in the reign of Emperor Gaozu of Tang, it was renamed Anning County for four years (621 AD). In the Yuan dynasty (1275 AD), the county was promoted to a state. In the 2nd year of the Republic of China (1913 AD), the county was restored. On April 20, 1950, Anning County People's Government was established. In October 1956, Anning County was changed to Anning District of Kunming City. In September 1959, it was renamed Anning County. On October 13, 1995, the county was withdrawn from the city and established under the jurisdiction of Kunming City.

Climate

References

Further reading 
 Area Code and Postal Code in Yunnan Province

External links 
Anning City government website

 
County-level divisions of Kunming
Cities in Yunnan